Afonso Pedro Canga (born February 10, 1959) is the current Minister of Agriculture and Rural Development for Angola.

References

Agriculture ministers of Angola
Living people
1959 births
Place of birth missing (living people)
21st-century Angolan politicians